Phyllonorycter koreana is a moth of the family Gracillariidae. It is known from Korea.

The wingspan is 6-7.8 mm.

References

koreana
Moths of Asia
Moths described in 1978